Kodamaea is a genus of fungi within the Saccharomycetales order. The relationship of this taxon to other taxa within the order is unknown (incertae sedis), and it has not yet been placed with certainty into any family.

References

External links
Kodamaea at Index Fungorum

Saccharomycetes